Abu Hena Md. Rahmatul Muneem is the chairperson of the National Board of Revenue and a director of Bangladesh Bank.

Early life 
Muneem was born in Sirajganj District. He did his undergraduate and graduate studies in geology from the University of Dhaka. He has a Masters of Business Administration from Northern University, Bangladesh. He is married to Laila Jesmin.

Career 
Muneem started his career in the Bangladesh Civil Service on 21 January 1986 as an administration cadre and worked as an Upazila Nirbahi Officer.

Muneem has also worked as Additional District Magistrate and Divisional Commissioner. He had served as the chairperson of Gas Transmission Company Limited and Bangladesh Petroleum Corporation.

Muneem served as the Senior Secretary in the Energy and Mineral Resources Division till January 2020. On 6 January 2020, he was appointed Chairperson of the National Board of Revenue. He replaced Md Mosharraf Hossain Bhuiyan. He is also the secretary of Internal Resources Division.

References 

Living people
People from Sirajganj District
University of Dhaka alumni
Bangladeshi civil servants
Year of birth missing (living people)